An unsaturated fat is a fat or fatty acid in which there is at least one double bond within the fatty acid chain.  A fatty acid chain is monounsaturated if it contains one double bond, and polyunsaturated if it contains more than one double bond.

Where double bonds are formed, hydrogen atoms are subtracted from the carbon chain. Thus, a saturated fat has no double bonds, has the maximum number of hydrogens bonded to the carbons, and therefore is "saturated" with hydrogen atoms. In cellular metabolism, unsaturated fat molecules contain somewhat less energy (i.e., fewer calories) than an equivalent amount of saturated fat. The greater the degree of unsaturation in a fatty acid (i.e., the more double bonds in the fatty acid) the more vulnerable it is to lipid peroxidation (rancidity). Antioxidants can protect unsaturated fat from lipid peroxidation.

Chemistry and nutrition 

Double bonds may be in either a cis or a trans isomer, depending on the geometry of the double bond. In the cis isomer, hydrogen atoms are on the same side of the double bond; whereas in the trans isomer, they are on opposite sides of the double bond (see trans fat). Saturated fats are useful in processed foods because saturated fats are less vulnerable to rancidity and usually more solid at room temperature than unsaturated fats. Unsaturated chains have a lower melting point, hence these molecules increase the fluidity of cell membranes.

Although both monounsaturated and polyunsaturated fats can replace saturated fat in the diet, trans unsaturated fats should not. Replacing saturated fats with unsaturated fats helps lower levels of total cholesterol and LDL cholesterol in the blood. Trans unsaturated fats are an exception because the double bond stereochemistry predisposes the carbon chains to assume a linear conformation, which conforms to rigid packing as in plaque formation. The geometry of the cis double bond induces a bend in the molecule, thereby precluding rigid formations (see  links above for drawings that illustrate this). Natural sources of fatty acids (see above) are rich in the cis isomer.

Although polyunsaturated fats are protective against cardiac arrhythmias, a study of post-menopauseal women with a relatively low fat intake showed that polyunsaturated fat is positively associated with progression of coronary atherosclerosis, whereas monounsaturated fat is not. This probably is an indication of the greater vulnerability of polyunsaturated fats to lipid peroxidation, against which vitamin E has been shown to be protective.

Examples of unsaturated fatty acids are palmitoleic acid, oleic acid, myristoleic acid, linoleic acid, and arachidonic acid. Foods containing unsaturated fats include avocado, nuts, olive oils, and vegetable oils such as canola. Meat products contain both saturated and unsaturated fats.

Although unsaturated fats are conventionally regarded as 'healthier' than saturated fats, the United States Food and Drug Administration (FDA) recommendation stated that the amount of unsaturated fat consumed should not exceed 30% of one's daily caloric intake.  Most foods contain both unsaturated and saturated fats. Marketers advertise only one or the other, depending on which one makes up the majority. Thus, various unsaturated fat vegetable oils, such as olive oils, also contain saturated fat.

In chemical analysis, fatty acids are separated by gas chromatography of methyl esters; additionally, a separation of unsaturated isomers is possible by argentation thin-layer chromatography.

Membrane composition as a metabolic pacemaker 
Studies on the cell membranes of mammals and reptiles discovered that mammalian cell membranes are composed of a higher proportion of polyunsaturated fatty acids (DHA, omega-3 fatty acid) than reptiles. Studies on bird fatty acid composition have noted similar proportions to mammals but with 1/3rd less omega-3 fatty acids as compared to omega-6 for a given body size. This fatty acid composition results in a more fluid cell membrane but also one that is permeable to various ions (H+ & Na+), resulting in cell membranes that are more costly to maintain. This maintenance cost has been argued to be one of the key causes for the high metabolic rates and concomitant warm-bloodedness of mammals and birds. However polyunsaturation of cell membranes may also occur in response to chronic cold temperatures as well. In fish increasingly cold environments lead to increasingly high cell membrane content of both monounsaturated and polyunsaturated fatty acids, to maintain greater membrane fluidity (and functionality) at the lower temperatures.

See also 

 Iodine value – a chemical analysis method to determine the proportion of unsaturated fat.
 List of unsaturated fatty acids

References 

Carboxylic acids

Food science
Lipids
Nutrition